The Military ranks of San Marino are the military insignia used by the Sammarinese Armed Forces. Due to the history of San Marino and its cultural ties to Italy, San Marino has a similar rank structure to that of Italian Armed Forces.

The  distinguishes rank by a series of chevrons and knots on the lower sleeves. Officers in the  also have a separate set of rank insignia displayed on their lower sleeves, made up of a series of bars and either one, two or three towers for junior, senior, and general officers respectively. General officers also have Greca in their rank insignia similar to their Italian counterparts. The  displays the same insignia as the epaulets of the  worn on either rank slides or patches.

Officers 
Officers of all Corps follow the same rank titles, with differences in the colors of the rank insignia worn dependent on the Corps.

Enlisted 
The enlisted ranks follow a standard format with  being present in most but not all of the corps and  only being present in the corps that are involved in policing duties.

References

Bibliography 
 
 
 </ref>
 
 
 
 
 
 
 

San Marino